208th may refer to:

208th Battalion (Canadian Irish), CEF, a unit in the Canadian Expeditionary Force during the First World War
208th Infantry Division (Germany), a large military unit that served during World War II
208th Rifle Division (Soviet Union), a Soviet infantry division in the Red Army during World War II

See also
208 (number)
208, the year 208 (CCVIII) of the Julian calendar
208 BC